Snåsavatnet is Norway's sixth-largest lake. The  lake is located in the municipalities of Steinkjer and Snåsa in Trøndelag county, Norway. The villages of Følling and Sunnan lie at the southwestern end of the lake and the village of Snåsa lies at the northeastern end of the lake. European route E6 runs along the northern shore of the lake and the Nordland Line  runs along the southern shore.

The lake was created by glacial erosion. As is seen on a map, the lake looks like an extension of the Trondheim Fjord. The outlet is the river Byaelva, which empties into the Beitstadfjorden (an arm of the Trondheim Fjord) in the city of Steinkjer.

See also
List of lakes in Norway

References

Steinkjer
Snåsa
Lakes of Trøndelag